Inch by Inch is a 1985 gay pornographic film, directed, written, and produced by Matt Sterling, cinematographed by Nick Eliot and Doug Williams, edited by Paul James, and starring Jeff Quinn, Doug Jensen and Tom Brock with Mark Miller, Jim Pulver, Mike Raymond, Steve Wright, Tony Stefano, Steve Henson, Toby Matson, Christopher Lance, Kevin Luken and Bill Joseph. The runtime is 64 minutes, and DVD copies have been distributed by the Falcon Studios. The film contains sequences in the order of appearance: a man seducing each of two trespassers in his apartment, a foursome on the rooftop, a threesome fantasy, a window voyeurism, and the subway scene.

Plot 
Tony Stefano finds Steve Henson and Mike Raymond trespassing his apartment and seduces each of them respectively. Afterwards, Tony then goes to his bed and then fantasizes a threesome scene. Meanwhile, Mark Miller, Christopher Lance, Bill Joseph, and Kevin Luken are engaging an orgy on the rooftop of the apartment building. In the next scenario, Mike Raymond voyeurs at Tom Brock by the window, and they then engage each other. In the last scenario, Jim Pulver and Jeff Quinn hook each other up in an empty subway car. The film ends with Tom Brock entering the subway and the following text: "The non-stop excitement continues.... [with Tom Brock ...going all the way] in the next Matt Sterling film, coming February 1986".

Scenes
 Apartment trespassing: Tony Stefano, Steve Henson, and Mike Raymond
 Rooftop: Mark Miller, Christopher Lance, Bill Joseph, and Kevin Luken
 Tony Stefano masturbating and fantasizing: Steve Wright, Doug Jensen, and Toby Matson
 Window voyeurism: Mike Raymond and Tom Brock
 Subway: Jim Pulver and Jeff Quinn

Reception 
Keeneye Reeves rated this film three out of four stars, called it a "hot 'n sleazy pre-condom fun that's worth seeing twice", and praised the sex scenes, yet Reeves criticized the runtime as "short" and ending as "hokey".

The reviewer from Rad Video rated this movie four out of five stars and praised its sex scenes and male bodies but found its runtime too short. Mark Adnum from Outrate called this film "a masterpiece of gay porn packed with great sex and hot guys". Both reviewers found its ending a tease to an upcoming sequel that never happened.

In the book The Culture of Queers (2002), Richard Dyon called the subway scene a blend of "realism and 'classical cinema'". Dyon observed: the production setting of "the interior of subway carriage" appeared "clean" and less gritty than the actual interior of the subway, as the graffiti were "too legible and too appropriate to be true." Nevertheless, he found sex performances of two men sexy, titillating, well shot and edited, and well-done signals of "abandonment and sexual hunger" as part of realism of anonymous sex.

Director Matt Sterling picked two scenes of this film as his favorites for the compilation of Matt Sterling's accomplishments, Best of All: the window voyeurism scene of Tom Brock and Mike Raymond, and the subway scene of Jim Pulver and Jeff Quinn.

In 1986, Inch by Inch won two Gay Producers Association Awards for the Best Video and Best Newcomer (Nick Eliot) and one Adam Film World award for the Gay Movie of the Year.

Notes 
Footnotes

Inline references

References 
 Dyer, Richard. The Culture of Queers. London: Routledge—Taylor & Francis, 2002. Hardcover: . Paperback: .

Further reading 
 Escoffier, Jeffrey. Bigger Than Life: The History of Gay Porn Cinema from Beefcake to Hardcore. Philadelphia, PA: Running Press Book Publishers, 2009. . Unabridged edition.

External links 
 

1985 films
Gay pornographic films
1980s pornographic films
1980s English-language films